Nizhalgal is a 1980 Indian Tamil-language drama film co-written and directed by Bharathiraja. The film stars primarily newcomers such as S. Rajasekar (credited as Rajasekaran), Raadhu (credited as Rohini), Ravi, Chandrasekhar and Suvitha. It revolves around a group of youngsters and their struggles to overcome the challenges faced by them in society.

The film's crew contained a host of newcomers including the lyricist Vairamuthu and Manivannan, both would later go on to become an established lyricist and a director respectively. It was released on 6 November 1980. Though a commercial failure, the film received critical acclaim and was screened at the "Indian Panorama" section of the International Film Festival of India in 1981. The same year it won two awards at the Tamil Nadu State Film Awards.

Plot 
Gopi and Hari, two unemployed graduates, share a room in Madras. While Gopi is looking for a job, Hari, a harmonium player, aspires to become a music composer in the film industry. They both manage to make ends meet with the help of their friends. Their neighbour is Prabhu, a college student who spends all his time smoking, painting and singing. A new family relocates to their apartment. The couple have a daughter Mahalakshmi. Prabhu and Maha both study in the same college and become good friends. Prabhu decides to apprentice under a veena exponent, who dies before Prabhu joins the class.

Gopi gives tuition to Maha and they fall in love. During this time, Gopi, Hari, and Prabhu get arrested for different reasons. Maha pledges her necklace and bails them out. In an attempt to reform, Prabhu meets his college principal but gets dismissed from the college after impulsively slapping him for extinguishing his cigarette on a flower. He is scolded by his father but Maha is supportive of him. Prabhu assumes that she loves him. During this time Maha's parents force her to discontinue her tuition as some of their relatives suspect she and Gopi are in a relationship. Hari gets a break in films and receives an advance payment from the producers. Using the sum, they return Maha's necklace. By this time, Maha's parents start looking for a groom for her.

Maha meets Gopi and advises him to find a job so that they can marry. Hari is dropped from the film because the financier of the film does not want a new, untested music composer. Gopi and Hari are evicted from their room for not paying the rent, and seek shelter with Mani, a rickshaw puller. Gopi gets a telegram informing him that his father is dead. To bear Gopi's travel expenses, Mani's son Singam goes out but meets with an accident. Hari tries to make money by becoming a street performer but fails. Gopi approaches a moneylender to borrow money for Singam's treatment. The moneylender talks ill about Singam, angering Gopi into stabbing the moneylender and taking his money. When he arrives, he sees that Singam is dead.

Meanwhile, Maha's parents arrange a marriage for her. When she meets Prabhu, he confesses his love for her. A shocked Maha informs him that she never loved him, only Gopi. Prabhu is disappointed and feels life has betrayed him at every turn. He tries to molest Maha but stops when she takes a knife and threatens that she will kill herself. Prabhu feels guilty, takes the knife and stabs himself to death. By this time, Gopi arrives at her house and informs her that he has killed the moneylender for money. They both decide to take the next step and are married immediately. The next day they are arrested for the deaths of Prabhu and the moneylender. Hari throws his harmonium in the sea and becomes insane.

Cast 
Rajasekaran as Prabhu
Rohini as Mahalakshmi (Maha)
Ravi as Gopi
Chandrasekhar as Hari
 Suvitha as Poongothai
Charuhasan as the veena exponent
Manivannan as Mani
Janagaraj as the moneylender
K. K. Soundar as Gopi's father
Master Haja Sheriff as Singam
 Rasi Ramasamy as Maha's father
Ilaiyaraaja (special appearance)
R. K. Kumar (special appearance)
R. Purusothaman (special appearance in "Madai Thiranthu")

Production 
Manivannan joined Bharathiraja's unit as an assistant in the film. He scripted the story and co-wrote the film with Bharathiraja. The film's cast, principal cast in particular – Ravi, Chandrasekhar, Raadhu, and Rajasekar – completely featured newcomers. Raadhu was credited as Rohini, and Rajasekar as Rajasekaran. Ravi was earlier asked to audition for Bharathiraja's Niram Maratha Pookkal (1979) as a dubbing artist for the lead character. However, since Bharathiraja himself dubbed for character, Ravi was dropped. Bharathiraaja, however, signed up Ravi for Nizhalgal as the lead actor, thus marking Ravi's cinematic debut. Bharathiraja cast Rajasekar because he liked his eyes. Some outdoor scenes were filmed in Mekkarai.

Themes 
The main theme of the film is unemployment.

Soundtrack 
The music was composed by Ilaiyaraaja. The song "Ithu Oru Pon Malai" was written by Vairamuthu, making his cinematic debut. He got the starting lines ready within 30 minutes. The song is set in Kedaram raga, while "Poongathave" is set in Mayamalavagowla. The rock and roll song "Madai Thiranthu" was later remixed by Yogi B and Natchatra in their album Vallavan. A remix version of "Ithu Oru Pon Malai" is featured on music artist M. Rafi's album Aasaiyae Alaipolae. Ilaiyaraaja later reused "Dhoorathil Naan Kanda" as "Vennello Godari" for the Telugu film Sitaara (1984).

Release and reception 
Nizhalgal was released on 6 November 1980 alongside Varumayin Niram Sivappu with both films having similar themes of unemployment. Although the film's story, music and the performance of the cast members received critical acclaim, it failed at the box office. After the film's release, the name "Nizhalgal" was added to Ravi's name as a prefix.

Accolades 
At the Tamil Nadu State Film Awards (1981), Nizhalgal won two awards – Best Music Director (for Ilaiyaraaja) and Best Male Playback Singer (for S. P. Balasubrahmanyam). At the International Film Festival of India in 1981, Nizhalgal was one of the 21 films to be screened at the Indian Panorama section. It was one of the two Tamil films to be screened at the festival; the other being Doorathu Idi Muzhakkam which was released the same year.

Legacy 
Made in the neo-realistic style, the film was a different attempt by Bharathiraja. The French film critic Yves Thoraval in his The cinemas of India stated: "a gloomy and violent film despite musical scenes with pretty dancers in short skirts." In 2008, short filmmaker R. V. Ramani in an interview with The Hindu recalled Nizhalgal as being a film that made a strong impact on him. He further called the film as a pathbreaking one in Tamil cinema. In a 2015 interview, Bharathiraja noted that he had to return to mainstream filmmaking due to the financial failure of Nizhalgal.

References

Bibliography

External links 
 

1980 drama films
1980 films
1980s Tamil-language films
Films directed by Bharathiraja
Films scored by Ilaiyaraaja
Indian drama films
Unemployment in fiction